Enrique Thompson (15 December 1897 – 22 December 1928) was an Argentine hurdler. He competed in the men's 400 metres hurdles at the 1924 Summer Olympics.

References

External links
 

1897 births
1928 deaths
Athletes (track and field) at the 1924 Summer Olympics
Argentine male hurdlers
Argentine decathletes
Olympic athletes of Argentina
Place of birth missing
Olympic decathletes